Kenya Hathaway is an American contemporary R&B and jazz singer. She is the daughter of R&B and jazz singer Donny Hathaway and classically trained vocalist Eulaulah and is the younger sister of Lalah Hathaway, also a R&B and jazz singer.

Kenya Hathaway attended the Berklee College of Music, in Boston. She has performed with many prominent artists including with Lee Ritenour on his track "Papa Was A Rollin' Stone", and "Morning Glory". She has made some 30 performances on American Idol: The Search for a Superstar as a backing singer.
Her older sister, Lalah Hathaway, is a singer-songwriter, record producer, arranger, and pianist.

Kenya Hathaway was also the voice actress behind Sunny Funny in the PlayStation video game, PaRappa the Rapper.

References

External links
Official site
Hathaway sings Is It You? with Lee Ritenour
Hathaway sings Morning Glory with Lee Ritenour

21st-century African-American women singers
American neo soul singers
Living people
Berklee College of Music alumni
21st-century American singers
21st-century American women singers
Year of birth missing (living people)